"E penso a te" (English: And I think of you) is a song composed in 1970 by Lucio Battisti based on the lyrics by Mogol. Initially sung by Bruno Lauzi, it was subsequently re-recorded by numerous other artists. The most popular version remains the one which its author gave in 1972.

The song

Meaning 
The lyrics recount the nostalgic thoughts of a man who is in love with a somewhat distant woman. The song does not say who she is: she may be a former lover or wife, with whom the protagonist broke up, or maybe just a casually encountered woman he immediately fell in love with.

The protagonist, in any case, can't help but think of her constantly: the first and third stanza describe the actions of his daily life, each one followed by "... e penso a te" ("... and I think of you"), a line which highlights his obsession and his inability to fully enjoy what he is doing. During the day, the protagonist is at work, then comes home, and has a date with his current girlfriend, but keeps on thinking to his real love and fails to appear funny and involved; he finally goes to bed but can't sleep for the same reason. In the second stanza, he asks himself what she might be doing in this moment and bets she is searching for him too; but he has no true hope, because "the city is too big for two who, like us, are looking for each other".

The three stanzas are followed by an instrumental coda which represents the explosion of nostalgia. In Battisti's rendering, the coda has a final diminuendo in which all of the instruments dissolve into silence, leaving only the singer's voice, as to represent his loneliness in the world.

Mogol, who wrote the song's lyrics, told that the protagonist «still hopes in a casual encounter; the desire to see each other is such that there is the will for a miracle, for something impossible, opposed to the reality which seems impregnable. [...] It's a constant search. As if they were dogs: there's something that goes beyond reasoning, a kind of animal instinct».

Composition 
The lyrics of the song were written in just 19 minutes during a drive on the Milano-Como Highway in which Mogol composed the lyrics almost entirely improvising while Lucio Battisti sung the melody line. The drive took place on a full-loaded tiny car; on board there were four people including Mario Lavezzi. According to some versions, Battisti was driving, according to others he was sitting in the passenger seat and Mogol himself drove the car.

When Battisti composed the song, he didn't believe it could become successful: he famously said that «this one won't make it, doesn't have enough rhythm, it's weak». For this reason, he didn't record the song himself but gave it to Bruno Lauzi, and even Lauzi's rendering wasn't given much emphasis (it was released in 1970 as B-side of another song written by Battisti and Mogol, named Mary oh Mary). The single wasn't a success and sold just over 30,000 copies. The song became a hit and a classic of Italian pop music only two years later, when Battisti sung the song himself and included it in the album Umanamente uomo: il sogno.

Legacy 
According to a document published on 5 August 2009, the song was censured in Argentina by the National Reorganization Process with the newsletter 24-COMFER on 25 July 1978, along with songs by other internationally famous artists such as John Lennon, Queen, Joan Baez, The Doors, Pink Floyd, Donna Summer and Eric Clapton.

Versions and albums

Bruno Lauzi
Published in 1970 as a B-side of a 45 record along with the song Mary oh Mary, it was then included, in the same year, in the album Bruno Lauzi.

Musicians
Franz Di Cioccio: drums 
Damiano Dattoli: bass
Flavio Premoli: piano
Andrea Sacchi: acoustic guitar
Mario Lavezzi: guitar
Giampiero Reverberi: arrangement and orchestra conductor

Mina 
In 1971 Mina sang it, including it as an opening track on the album Mina.

Musicians 
Gianni Cazzola: drums 
Dario Baldan Bembo: organ
Andrea Sacchi: electric and acoustic guitar
Massimo Verardi: electric guitar
Giancarlo Barigozzi: flute
Al Korvin, Oscar Valdambrini, Fermo Lini, Giuliano Bernicchi: trumpets
Sergio Almangano, Arturo Prestipino Giarritta: first violins
Pino Presti: arrangement, orchestra conductor, bass

Lucio Battisti 
The version sung by Lucio Battisti was published in 1972 in the album Umanamente uomo: il sogno and was subsequently republished in numerous anthologies, among which in 2004 in the anthology Le avventure di Lucio Battisti e Mogol.

Musicians
Massimo Luca: electric guitar, acoustic guitar
Eugenio Guarraia: electric guitar
Angelo Salvador: electric bass
Tony Cicco: drums e percussion
Lucio Battisti: electric guitar, piano and wha wha
Dario Baldan Bembo: organ, piano, keyboard
Mario Lavezzi, Oscar Prudente, Tony Cicco, Babelle Douglas, Barbara Michelin e Sara: choir, violins, violas, violoncellos e ocarina
Giampiero Reverberi: director

Tanita Tikaram

This English version of the Italian "E penso a te" ("And I Think of You") was initially an unreleased track on the compilation "The Best of Tanita Tikaram". Promotional singles of the song were sent to several radio stations. In 1998, the track appeared as a bonus track on the Japanese version of Tikaram's sixth studio album "The Cappuccino Songs". It was also released as a bonus track on the Italian edition of "The Cappuccino Songs", and released as a promotional single there in 1998. Joe McElderry covered the song for his fourth studio album, Here's What I Believe.

Track listing

1996 European Promo CD

"And I Think of You – E Penso A Te" (Radio Edit) (3:22)
"Twist in My Sobriety" (Tikaramp Radio) (4:23)
"And I Think of You – E Penso A Te" (Album Version) (4:18)

1998 Italian Promo CD

"And I Think of You – E Penso A Te" (Album Version) (4:18)

Other
There have been other recordings made by other artists; after the recording by Bruno Lauzi it was recorded by Raffaella Carrà who included the song in the eponymous LP and by Johnny Dorelli who included it as a B-side on the 45 record Love Story.

The song has been covered by numerous artists including Ornella Vanoni (1986 – Ornella &...), Mietta (2003 – Abbracciati e vivi / Sentirti / E penso a te), Raf (2005 – Tutto Raf), Antonio Spadaccino (2006 –  Antonino), Fiorella Mannoia (2009 – Ho imparato a sognare) e Enrico Ruggeri.

On 21 June 2009 the song was covered by Fiorella Mannoia and Laura Pausini for the Abruzzo earthquake benefit concert Amiche per l'Abruzzo. The song was included in the eponymous DVD the following year.

In 1991 Enrico Rava produced an instrumental version in the tribute album "Ci ritorni in mente".

Mina and Iva Zanicchi have recorded two different versions in Spanish, Jean-François Michel in French and other in Spanish, Ajda Pekkan in Turkish, and Johnny Dorelli in English.

In 2012 Letizia Gambi recorded an English/ Italian version "And I think of You/ E penso a te" on her album Introducing Letizia Gambi with Patrice Rushen on piano and Lenny White on drums.

Notes

Italian songs
1970 songs
Songs written by Mogol (lyricist)
Lucio Battisti songs
Raffaella Carrà songs
Mina (Italian singer) songs
Tanita Tikaram songs
Songs written by Lucio Battisti